Cobain is an Irish surname originating in County Tyrone, Northern Ireland. The family descended from French Huguenots who arrived in Ireland in 1640, originally carrying the name De Gobienne. The Cobain family mostly settled in Aughnacloy, Ballygawley and Skey in Carnteel, before spreading out to Carrickmore around 1800. They have also spelled their name Cobane, Qubain, Cobaine, Cabane, Cabine, Qubein, Qubean and Cabeans.

Notable people with the surname include:

Kurt Cobain (1967–1994), American musician, frontman of the grunge band Nirvana
Frances Bean Cobain (born 1992), Cobain's daughter with wife Courtney Love
Arez Cobain (born 1988), American rapper
Arthur Cobain (1880–1941), Australian rules footballer 
Fred Cobain (born 1946), Unionist politician from Northern Ireland
Garry Cobain (born 1967), English electronic musician
Ian Cobain (born 1960), British journalist
Rod Cobain (born 1946), Australian rules footballer

Notable people with the nickname:

Black Cobain (born 1986), stage name of American rapper Marcus Gloster

See also 
Edward de Cobain (1840–1908), Irish Conservative politician
Cockbain

External links
Cobanes in Ireland